The glucagon receptor family is a group of closely related G-protein coupled receptors which include:

 Glucagon receptor
 Glucagon-like peptide 1 receptor 
 Glucagon-like peptide 2 receptor
 Gastric inhibitory polypeptide receptor

The first three receptors bind closely related peptide hormones (glucagon, glucagon-like peptide-1, glucagon-like peptide-2) derived from the proglucagon polypeptide.  The last receptor binds gastric inhibitory polypeptide.

References

External links

G protein-coupled receptors